I Know That Name is the twelfth solo studio album by the English singer-songwriter Paul Carrack. It was originally released in 2008 on Carrack's own Carrack-UK label.

A reissue billed as the "Ultimate Version" was released in 2014.  This reissue featured two additional tracks, replaced six tracks with newly remixed versions, and altered the running order.

Carrack originally recorded the song "Eyes Of Blue" on his 1996 album Blue Views.  The version on I Know That Name is an entirely new recording.

Reception

AllMusic's Stephen Thomas Erlewine opines: "I Know That Name glides by on a mellow, soulful groove ... It's easy-rolling and even-handed, offering no surprises but plenty of comfort if you've ever been a fan of any of Carrack's work over the years."

William Pinfold of Record Collector notes that I Know That Name "should further bolster [Carrack's] reputation as a first-rate singer, songwriter and keyboardist...an album of mature, well-performed modern soul and soft rock."

Track listing

Personnel
Track numbers refer to the original 2008 issue.
 Paul Carrack – vocals, Hammond B3 organ (1), all other instruments (2-6, 8, 9, 12), clavinet (7), horn arrangements (7, 11), all instruments (10)
 Mike Rohaus – Wurlitzer electric piano (1), clavinet (1), Hammond B3 organ (1)
 Michael Martin – keyboards (7), rhythm section (7), basic track arrangements (7, 11), horn arrangements (7, 11)
 Carlton "Bubblers" Ogilvie – keyboards (7), rhythm section (7)
 Robert McNally – guitars (1)
 Stanley Andrews – guitars (7) 
 Craig Young – bass guitar (1)
 Colin McNeish – bass guitar (7)
 Chad Cromwell – drums (1)
 Brian Pruitt – drum programming (1)
 Al Shux – drum programming (1)
 LilI Yoncheva – percussion (7)
 Mark Douthit – baritone saxophone (1), tenor saxophone (1)
 Steve Beighton – saxophones (2, 3, 4, 6, 8, 9, 12)
 Brian Edwards – saxophones (7)
 Barry Green – trombone (1)
 Henry Tenyue – trombone (7)
 Quentin Ware – trumpet (1), horn arrangements (1)
 Patrick Tenyue – trumpet (7)
 Ed Collins – trumpet (2, 3, 4, 6, 8, 9), flugelhorn (12)
 John Catchings – cello (1)
 Kristin Wilkinson – viola (1)
 David Angell – violin (1)
 David Davidson – violin (1), string arrangements (1)
 Chris Pelcer – string arrangements (1)
 Drea Rhenee – backing vocals (1)
 Jackie Wilson – backing vocals (1)
 Don Henley – backing vocals (2)
 Timothy B. Schmit – backing vocals (2)
 Lindsay Dracass – backing vocals (3, 4, 6, 8, 9)
 Sam Moore – guest vocals (8)

Production
 Peter Collins – producer (1)
 Paul Carrack – producer (2-12)
 Bobby Shin – horn and string engineer (1)
 Ren Swan – mixing (1, 2)
 Richard Woodcraft – mixing (3-9, 11)
 Nigel Bates – mixing (10, 12)
 Jeff Mortimer – mastering
 Ian Ross – design

References

External links

2008 albums
Paul Carrack albums